The Logan School for Creative Learning is a private school in Denver, Colorado that serves gifted students grades K-8. The mission of The Logan School for Creative Learning is to "cultivate the curiosities of gifted children." The Logan School for Creative Learning is a progressive school with a dynamic curriculum that teaches the way children learn by giving them hands-on experiences fueled by their own curiosities. Logan students, aged 4.5–14 years old, are co-architects with their teachers in building meaningful units of study that not only address the traditional academics but also emphasize research, reasoning and recording.

History 
The Logan School for Creative Learning (previously The Denver School for the Gifted and Creative) was founded by Patti McKinnell in 1981 and began with seven children in a church basement on South Federal Boulevard in Denver. In 1999, The Logan School moved to the former Lowry Air Force Base, where today it is one of several independent schools on a  former military site that has been redeveloped as a mixed-use urban community.

Markus Hunt is the current Head of School. His past positions include Assistant Head at Cathedral School for Boys in San Francisco and Dean/Latin Teacher at The Trinity School in Manhattan.

McKinnel retired at the end of the 2019–2020 school year.

Curriculum

The Logan School's student program focuses on individual student interests. Students select a unit of study which they pursue throughout the school year. Units reflect both the student's academic interests and true passions. They cover a wide variety of topics and integrate diverse academic subjects. Logan students are co-architects with their teachers in building meaningful units of study that not only address the traditional academics but also emphasize research, reasoning and recording.

Accreditation
The Logan School is accredited through ACIS Association of Colorado Independent Schools and is a full member of NAIS National Association of Independent Schools

Recognition
Some Logan students received an award from the National Renewable Energy Laboratory (NREL) for their work.

Athletics
Students on sports teams play against other schools in the area. Sports offered as of 2020 include: co-ed cross country, girls volleyball, boys and girls basketball, co-ed ultimate frisbee and girls soccer.

Admission process
The admission process includes a parent tour and information session, application, student questionnaire, teacher recommendation and the completion of either a Wechsler or Differential Ability Scales test. Once all the paperwork is submitted, a parent interview and classroom observation may be scheduled. A panel reviews each application to determine the school's ability to serve the applicant, after which families are notified if they will be offered a position, or if their child will be added to a wait list.

References

External links
Logan School

Schools in Denver
Private elementary schools in Colorado
Private middle schools in Colorado
Gifted education
Educational institutions established in 1989
1989 establishments in Colorado